The SS Samarkand (Hull Number 1769, launched as the SS Peter Cooper) was a Liberty ship built in the United States during World War II.

Originally named after Peter Cooper, an American industrialist, inventor and philanthropist, the ship was laid down by Alabama Drydock and Shipbuilding Company on 24 July 1943, then launched on 25 August 1943.  She was loaned to Great Britain as part of the Lend-Lease program where she was renamed the SS  Samarkand.  She was renamed after the Uzbek city of Samarkand.  The ship survived the war and was sold into private ownership in 1947.  She was scrapped in 1971.

External links
U.S. Maritime Service Veterans 

Peter Cooper
Liberty ships
Ships built in Alabama
1943 ships